Kazi Nazrul Islam (25 May 1899 – 29 August 1976) is the National poet of Bangladesh.
Kazi Nazrul Islam may also refer to:

 Jatiya Kabi Kazi Nazrul Islam University
 Kazi Nazrul Islam International Airport
 Kazi Nazrul Islam Sarani
 Kavi Nazrul Metro Station
 Kazi Nazrul University
 List of works of Kazi Nazrul Islam